Operation Rubicon was a Scottish police investigation into allegations of phone hacking, breach of data protection and perjury.

The operation was initiated by a complaint from Tommy Sheridan's family solicitor, Aamer Anwar, including allegations of perjury, phone hacking and breach of data protection.

The operation was a major investigation, led by Detective Superintendent John McSporran. The Herald has reported that 50 officers are assigned to the case

The investigation detained Andy Coulson on 30 May 2012 and charged him with perjury.

On 3 June 2015, Coulson was formally acquitted after a judge dismissed the case against him. All other cases investigated by Operation Rubicon were dropped without coming to trial.

Background

On 16 December 2007, Sheridan was charged with perjury following a defamation case against the News of the World. On 23 December 2010, a jury found him guilty of perjury and on 26 January 2011 he was sentenced to 3 years in prison.

See also 
 Tommy Sheridan
 HM Advocate v Sheridan and Sheridan
 Operation Weeting
 Operation Elveden
 Operation Tuleta
 Operation Motorman (ICO investigation)
 Metropolitan police role in phone hacking scandal
 News media phone hacking scandal
 Phone hacking scandal reference lists

References

External links 
Statement by Defend Tommy Sheridan Campaign
Defend Tommy Sheridan Campaign Web Site

News International phone hacking scandal
Rubicon
2011 establishments in Scotland